Anders Christer Lyrbring (born 21 March 1978 in Gothenburg, Västra Götaland County) is a former freestyle swimmer from Sweden. He won the  silver medal in the 4 × 200 m Freestyle Relay at the 1996 Summer Olympics together with Christer Wallin, Anders Holmertz and Lars Frölander.

Clubs 
 Simavdelningen 1902

References 
 databaseOlympics
 

1978 births
Living people
Swimmers from Gothenburg
Swimmers at the 1996 Summer Olympics
Olympic swimmers of Sweden
Olympic silver medalists for Sweden
Swedish male freestyle swimmers
Simavdelningen 1902 swimmers
Medalists at the 1996 Summer Olympics
Olympic silver medalists in swimming
20th-century Swedish people
21st-century Swedish people